The United States cricket team in Canada in 1845 was the second to visit another country following Canada's visit to the US in 1844.

Canada and USA staged the second-ever cricket international at McGill University, Montreal on 30 and 31 July. Canada won the match by 61 runs after USA had won the toss and decided to field.

Canada scored 80 in their first innings with a top score of 29 by Charles Birch while Henry Groom captured 5 wickets. USA replied with 79, George Sharpe taking 6 wickets, but Canada improved in the second innings and made 135, a good score in the contemporary conditions. Sharpe, making a fine all-round contribution, scored 31 and Lieutenant Hornby scored 35. Groom took another four wickets.  Needing 137 to win, USA could only manage 75 after David Winckworth took eight wickets.

The two teams met later the same year in New York, with Canada winning again by 2 wickets.

Match details

References

Further reading
 Rowland Bowen, Cricket: A History of its Growth and Development, Eyre & Spottiswoode, 1970
 Roy Morgan, Encyclopedia of World Cricket, SportsBooks Ltd, 2007

Canadian cricket in the 19th century
International cricket competitions from 1844 to 1888
International cricket tours of North America
United States cricket in the 19th century
United States cricket tours abroad
July 1845 events